Steve Garner is a professional American bridge player. Garner finished second in the World Championship in 2007 and has won 10 North American Bridge Championships. He lives in Chicago.

Bridge accomplishments

Awards

 Fishbein Trophy (1) 1997

Wins

 North American Bridge Championships (11)
 von Zedtwitz Life Master Pairs (1) 1997 
 Nail Life Master Open Pairs (2) 2000, 2006 
 Grand National Teams (2) 1991, 1995 
 Keohane North American Swiss Teams (1) 1996 
 Mitchell Board-a-Match Teams (1) 2012 
 Reisinger (2) 1997, 2001 
 Vanderbilt (2) 2019, 2023

Runners-up

 Bermuda Bowl (1) 2007
 Buffett Cup (1) 2008
 North American Bridge Championships (10)
 Rockwell Mixed Pairs (1) 1985 
 Grand National Teams (1) 1988 
 Jacoby Open Swiss Teams (2) 2002, 2014 
 Mitchell Board-a-Match Teams (3) 1978, 1987, 2002 
 Reisinger (2) 2008, 2010 
 Spingold (1) 2008

Notes

External links
 

American contract bridge players
Bermuda Bowl players
Living people
Year of birth missing (living people)
Place of birth missing (living people)